Terdiman is a surname. Notable people with the surname include:

 Daniel Terdiman, American journalist
 Jayson Terdiman (born 1988), American luger